Rupture was a social networking site for gamers. Users were able to create profiles and interact with one another with the standard array of social networking tools.

History  
Rupture was founded by Shawn Fanning and Jon Baudanza in June 2006. He did so because he wished to foster communication between players, find out what they're playing, and provide a showcase where they could display their accomplishments.

In June 2008 Electronic Arts, Inc. purchased ThreeSF, Inc., parent company of Rupture for $15 million.

The website is no longer accessible and redirects to EA.com.

References

External links
 Official website

Internet properties established in 2006
American social networking websites
Adobe Integrated Runtime platform software